Kiswe is a startup company that makes live streaming technology for live sports, entertainment and video.

Kiswe is headquartered in the U.S. and has offices in Europe and Asia.

Background
The company was started in autumn 2013. Its three founders are Jeong Kim, an engineer and former president of Bell Labs; Wim Sweldens, a scientist and innovator in communications and signal processing who had been at Alcatel-Lucent; and Jimmy Lynn, former sports executive with AOL and professor at Georgetown University’s McDonough School of Business. During its stealth mode period, Kim said the new venture was at the juncture of next-generation Web technology and sports and said that their "secret sauce" was the technology to allow interactive video to be applied to sports.  Kim's initial goals were for $1 million in funding.

Partnerships
The first substantial use of Kiswe technology came in May 2014 in the Women's National Basketball Association, when the Washington Mystics began testing the Mystics Live application. Mystics Live is a free mobile application that allows users view the team's home games live on their smartphone or tablet, choosing among the broadcast feed or five alternate camera angles, triggering replays from any of those angles, and showing real-time statistics. It can be used both by fans at the game or by those not at the game but within a  radius.

Ted Leonsis, owner of the Mystics and its Monumental Network digital platform, said Mystics Live would enhance the in-arena experience for the team's fans and in general better engage and reach the mobile generation. (Kiswe co-founder Kim is a partner in Monumental Sports & Entertainment, the group that Leonsis heads.)  The WNBA was an effective vehicle for the application because the league is more open to new business ventures and because there are no entrenched regional sports networks paying rights fees to carry Mystics games who would object to a local streaming service.

Kiswe is partnering with the National Basketball Association to expand viewership beyond traditional broadcasts through remote production tools. Kiswe's cloud-based platform delivers picture-in-picture viewing experiences during NBA games, which allow digital viewers to switch in and out of alternative audio feeds presented by guest commentators. In an interview with SportsPro Media, Melissa Brenner, EVP of Digital Media at the NBA stated, "The [Kiswe] technology is relatively easy to set up and easy to scale, so we are having a lot of fun experimenting with that. It is good for us on two levels; to understand how to scale personalisation, but also to learn how to train the next generation of broadcasters."

In 2019, Kiswe launched a strategic partnership with Vidgo, a live TV streaming service, to enable social interactions for Vidgo's mobile app while people watch live TV. Kiswe also worked with CrossFit to provide an open-source broadcasting model for their annual CrossFit Games, allowing their community to take an open feed and freely distribute the program on any platform or channel they choose. The result led to 28 open-source broadcasts, which brought in over 70 remote casters with broadcasts delivered in 10 different languages.

On June 8, 2020 Kiswe announced a strategic partnership with HYBE (then still Big Hit Entertainment) for BTS' Bang Bang Con: The Live. The virtual concert took place on June 14, 2020 and garnered over 750,000 views, achieving the Guinness World Records title for most viewers for a music concert live stream. The live-streamed show reached a peak of 756,000 concurrent viewers in 107 countries and territories. Attendance was the equivalent of 15 shows at a 50,000 seat stadium and was the biggest audience for a paid virtual concert, according to Variety Magazine. The partnership saw a dynamic live streaming concert that let fans "have a heightened experience that includes features such as interactive regional chats and “choosing their own seat” via different viewing options." The experience also let audience members from around the world feel like they're in the same venue with innovative fan engagement features.

Business model
Kiswe is part of a wave of over-the-top content programming that provides alternate digital platforms that are not delivered via traditional cable or satellite services.

The company's applications are designed to appeal to the younger demographic; as Kiswe co-founder Lynn has said, "One situation facing the major leagues is the youth market. They are losing the youth market because there are so many mobile devices, social networking and gaming." Co-founder and Chief Architect Sweldens has stressed that the company wants to create innovation in the space where television, mobile, and social media intersect.

Kiswe Studio is a remote production platform used by broadcasters, media companies and sports leagues to integrate commentators and call live games in their native language.

References

American companies established in 2013
Software companies based in New Jersey
Privately held companies based in New Jersey
Mobile software
Software companies of the United States